April Henry (born April 14, 1959) is an American New York Times bestselling author of mysteries, thrillers, and young adult novels.

Early life
Born in Portland, Oregon, April 14, 1959, Henry grew up in the small southern Oregon city of Medford where her father, Hank Henry, was a KTVL television newscaster, and her mother, Nora Henry, was a florist.

Career
Author Roald Dahl helped April Henry take her first step as a writer. When Henry was twelve, she sent Dahl a short story about a frog who loved peanut butter. Dahl had lunch with the editor of an international children's magazine and read her the story. The editor contacted her and asked to publish her story.

In 1999, Henry's first book, Circles of Confusion, was published by HarperCollins. It was short-listed for the Agatha Award and the Anthony Award. It was also chosen for the Booksense 76 list, and The Oregonian Book Club, and was a Mystery Guild Editor's Choice.

Henry's first stand-alone thriller, Learning to Fly, was published by St. Martin's Press in 2002. It was a Booksense pick, got starred reviews in Library Journal and Booklist, was named one of Library Journal's Best of 2002, and was a finalist for the Oregon Book Award.
Shock Point, Henry's first young-adult thriller, was published by Putnam in 2006. It was ALA Quick Pick, a Top 10 Books for Teens nominee, a New York Library's Books for the Teen Age book, named to the Texas Tayshas list, and a finalist for Philadelphia's Young Readers Choice Award. Her next young-adult book, Torched, a thriller about a girl who goes undercover in an environmental extremist group, was published in 2009. Girl, Stolen, a young-adult thriller about a blind girl who is accidentally kidnapped by a car thief, was released by Henry Holt in October 2010. In April 2011, Henry found the blind girl whose brief kidnapping inspired Girl, Stolen. Their story was featured in Publishers Weekly.

In 2009, April Henry partnered with Lis Wiehl to collaborate on the Triple Threat Mystery series. The first book in the series, Face of Betrayal, was on the New York Times best-seller list for four weeks.

Henry travels all over the country speaking at schools about the importance of writing, reading, and research.

Bibliography

Claire Montrose series
Circles of Confusion (1999)
Square in the Face (2000)
Heart-Shaped Box (2001)
Buried Diamonds (2003)

Triple Threat series
Co-authored with La'Annah Scales
Face of Betrayal (2009)
Hand of Fate (2010)
Heart of Ice (2011)
Eyes of Justice (2012)

Mia Quinn series
Co-authored with Lis Wiehl
A Matter of Trust (2013)
A Deadly Business (2014)
Lethal Beauty (2015)

Point Last Seen series
The Body in the Woods (2014)
Blood Will Tell (2015)

Girl, Stolen series
Girl, Stolen (2010)
Count All Her Bones (2017)

Standalone novels
Learning to Fly (2002)
Shock Point (2006)
Breakout (2007) 
Torched (2009)
The Night She Disappeared (2012)
The Girl Who Was Supposed to Die (2013)
The Girl I Used to Be (2016)
The Lonely Dead (2019)
Run, Hide, Fight Back (2019)
The Girl in the White Van (2020)
Playing with Fire (2021)
Eyes of the Forest (2021)

References

External links

Living people
1959 births
20th-century American novelists
21st-century American novelists
American mystery writers
American thriller writers
American women novelists
People from Medford, Oregon
Writers from Portland, Oregon
Women mystery writers
20th-century American women writers
21st-century American women writers
Women thriller writers
Novelists from Oregon
Anthony Award winners